"Breathe" is a song by Norwegian singer Astrid S, released as the first single from her second EP, Party's Over. The song was written by Astrid S herself along Rickard Göransson, Asia Whitacre and Oscar Holter, this later also serving as the song's producer.

Composition
The song has been described as a "sliky electro-pop anthem". She wrote it along songwriter Asia Whitacrae in a session with Wolf Cousins' producers Rickard Göransson and Oscar Holter, this later also producing it. In an interview with Idolator, Astrid S said that it was one of the most difficult songs she wrote as she spent two days on it. At first she found the song "too poppy" and wasn't able to picture herself singing the song, but after the track getting a different production, she changed her mind, calling "Breathe", "absolutely lusher than anything else I've done".

Music video
The music video, directed by Cherry Cobra Films and inspired by classic action films, including James Bond's work as well as Kill Bill and Mr. & Mrs. Smith was premiered via Vevo on 21 March 2017. She commented about the video's recording in an interview with Noisey: "People do it so well in movies, and I really felt the pressure. My heart was beating so fast, and I was practicing like crazy right before they said 'Action.' It was really nerve-wracking, because I wanted it to look really badass—but hopefully it does."

Charts

Certifications

References

External links

2017 songs
2017 singles
Astrid S songs
Island Records singles
Songs written by Rickard Göransson
Songs written by Oscar Holter
Songs written by Asia Whiteacre